Seán Tubridy (1897 – 15 July 1939) was an Irish politician and medical practitioner. Tubridy had two terms as a Fianna Fáil TD for Galway, from 1927 to 1932 and 1937 to 1939. His parents had originally moved to Carraroe in Connemara to teach at the local Irish-language school. Tubridy was also involved in Gaeltacht affairs and in the mid-1930s was a co-founder of Muintir na Gaeltachta, along with Peadar Duignan and Máirtín Ó Cadhain.

Early life
John Andrew Tubridy was born in 1897 at Galway, to Patrick Tubridy and Jane Waldron. He had only one sibling, Mary Margaret Patricia. Seán's father was from Kilmurry Ibrickane, County Clare, and his mother from Kilkelly, County Mayo; the two were Gaeilgeoirí and had moved to the Irish-speaking area of Connemara to teach at the Scoil Mhic Dara in Carraroe. They worked with Roger Casement and helped to set up a fund for free school dinners there. The two had a feud with a priest by the name of Fr. Healy and were attacked from the pulpit, but they received support from local parents.

Tubridy was a medical practitioner who fought against the epidemics of cholera, typhus and the Spanish Flu in Connemara. He married a Dublin woman by the name of Kathleen Moira Ryan, daughter of Hugh Ryan, the Professor of Chemistry at University College, Dublin. The youngest of their three children was a son Patrick Tubridy, who married Catherine Andrews, the daughter of Todd Andrews, a prominent former member of the Irish Republican Army. Patrick himself had several children, including the broadcaster Ryan Tubridy.

Dáil Éireann
Tubridy was first elected to Dáil Éireann as a Fianna Fáil Teachta Dála (TD) for the Galway constituency at the June 1927 general election. He was re-elected at the September 1927 general election but lost his seat at the 1932 general election. He stood unsuccessfully at the 1933 general election but was elected for the Galway West constituency at the 1937 general election. He was re-elected at the 1938 general election, but died during the 10th Dáil in July 1939. The by-election caused by his death was held on 30 May 1940 and was won by John J. Keane of Fianna Fáil.

See also
 Michael G. Tubridy

References

External links
My Story: Ryan Tubridy at RTÉ
Ryan Tubridy discovers ancestor’s letter to Roger Casement at Irish Times

1897 births
1939 deaths
Fianna Fáil TDs
Politicians from County Galway
Members of the 5th Dáil
Members of the 6th Dáil
Members of the 9th Dáil
Members of the 10th Dáil
Irish general practitioners